The Suzuki GS400E is a motorcycle that was part of the Suzuki GS series in production between 1978 and 1984.

Engine
The engine was a 399 cc plant that featured DOHC with four valves per cylinder.

GS400E
Motorcycles introduced in 1978